Huaniqueo is a municipality in the Mexican state of Michoacán, located approximately  northwest of the state capital of Morelia.

Geography
It borders the municipalities of Morelos to the north, Chucándiro to the east, Morelia to the south, Coeneo to the southwest, and Jiménez to the northwest.

As of 2009, the land cover in Huaniqueo consists of tropical forest (23%), temperate forest (21%), and grassland (17%). Another 36% of the land is used for agriculture and 1% consists of urban areas. Huaniqueo is drained by seasonal streams: about 94% of the municipality is in the basin of the Ángulo River, a tributary of the Lerma River, while the easternmost 6% is in the basin of Lake Cuitzeo.

Huaniqueo has a temperate climate with rain in the summer.

History
In the Purépecha language, Huaniqueo has been translated to mean either "place where corn is roasted" or "place of those who give or bring a sign". It is believed that the first settlement was of Otomi origin and was conquered by the Tarascans by 1450. After the arrival of the Spanish, the place was given the name Santa Marta Huaniqueo after its patron saint.

Huaniqueo was made a partido of Michoacán in 1825 and one of its original municipalities in 1831. On 23 April 1861, governor of Michoacán, renamed the municipal seat Huaniqueo de Morales in honour of the parish priest Juan José Pastor Morales, a supporter of the struggle for Mexican independence.

Administration
The municipal government comprises a president, a councillor (Spanish: síndico), and seven trustees (regidores), four elected by relative majority and three by proportional representation. The current president of the municipality is María Trinidad Vázquez Herrera.

Demographics
In the 2010 Mexican Census, the municipality of Huaniqueo recorded a population of 7983 inhabitants living in 2369 households. The 2015 Intercensal Survey estimated a population of 8093 inhabitants in Huaniqueo.

There are 27 localities in the municipality, of which only the municipal seat Huaniqueo de Morales is classified as urban. It recorded a population of 2566 inhabitants in the 2010 Census.

Economy
The main economic activity in Huaniqueo is agriculture. The municipality is responsible for 15% of Mexico's total lentil production, behind only Coeneo which accounts for 57%. There is low-level production of other crops and livestock for local consumption.

References

Municipalities of Michoacán
1825 establishments in Mexico
States and territories established in 1825